NUC or Nuc may refer to:

NUC

Organizations
 National Union Committee, a political organization in Bahrain
 National Universities Commission of Nigeria

In education
 North University of China, Taiyuan, Shanxi
 Newcastle University College, now part of the University of Newcastle (Australia)
 Newham College University Centre, Newham College of Further Education, London, UK
 National University College, Puerto Rico, US
 National Underclassmen Combine, a high school football program

In the military
 Navy Unit Commendation of the US Navy
 Naval Undersea Center, former US Navy organization - see Naval Information Warfare Center Pacific
 Naval Auxiliary Landing Field San Clemente Island, California, US, FAA code

Other uses
 National Union Catalog of US Library of Congress books
 Neutral unit of construction airline industry currency
 Next Unit of Computing, an Intel small PC
 Not Upwardly Compatible software

Nuc
 Nuc or nucleus (bee) colony
 Tomáš Nuc (born 1989), Czech footballer
 nuc, ISO 639-3 code for the Nukini language of Brazil